Laurent Lokoli (born 18 October 1994) is a French professional tennis player. Lokoli plays primarily ATP Challenger and ITF events. He has a career-high ATP singles ranking of No. 169 achieved on 30 January 2023.

Career 
Lokoli received a wildcard for the 2014 French Open men's singles qualifying draw. He won three qualifying matches and hence advanced to the main draw 1st round, where he lost to Steve Johnson. 

He was given a wildcard for the 2017 French Open where he lost in the first round to Martin Klizan. He made minor news by twice refusing to shake hands with Klizan after the match.

He reached the top 200 at No. 199 on 3 October 2022. He made his first Challenger final at the 2023 Open Nouvelle-Calédonie in Noumea, New Caledonia losing to Raul Brancaccio. As a result he reached a new career-high ranking of No. 176 inside the top 200 in 9 January 2023. Next he qualified into the 2023 Australian Open main draw after 8 years of absence.

Personal life
He is the son of former French footballer Dominique Lokoli.

Challenger and Futures/World Tennis Tour Finals

Singles: 25 (14-11)

References

External links

1994 births
Living people
French male tennis players
Sportspeople from Bastia
French sportspeople of Democratic Republic of the Congo descent
Black French sportspeople